Buzz Campbell is an American guitarist, vocalist and songwriter. He plays anything that is close to Rockabilly music, Blues, Swing, Country & Rock & roll. Campbell is also a songwriter. He has played with numerous "rockabilly acts", including Lee Rocker, Slim Jim Phantom and Brian Setzer, all original members of the Stray Cats.  Campbell and his group have also backed up and performed with such artists as Chuck Berry, Jerry Lee Lewis, Willie Nelson, Bo Diddley, Chris Isaak, and numerous others and has become a mainstay on the California rockabilly scene. He is now touring all over the American soil, in Canada and has a solid international reputation.

The early years 
Campbell was born on January 19, 1969,in Dallas, Texas. He was first introduced to 1950s doo-wop by his father’s old cassettes. He soon thereafter picked up the guitar, and with the influence of his uncle, began to learn 1950s-style rock and roll. At first it was just a hobby, but in 1991 at his twenty-first Birthday, he saw the Stray Cats perform live at the Bacchanal in San Diego, Calif. The show had such an impact on him that he dropped out of college, to concentrate on the music. 
Campbell has named Chuck Berry as his first real influence and later came Carl Perkins, Cliff Gallup, Scotty Moore, James Burton and the one he said was his biggest influence would be Brian Setzer, of the Stray Cats.

Career 
In 2001, Campbell was approached at a gig by Jocko Marcellino, one of the founding members of the 1950s group, Sha Na Na (2000–2004). This group is internationally known for their debut at Woodstock, their TV show in the mid-‘70s, and their cameo in the movie Grease. Campbell became the lead guitarist for Sha Na Na, and still occasionally performs with them. In 1995 Buzz also participated in the groupe called "The Bastard Sons Of Johnny Cash(They are now called: Mark Stuart and The Bastard Sons)", on the lead guitar. More than 10 years ago, Buzz was given the opportunity to open for Lee Rocker.(Present on both albums: Racin’ the Devil and Black Cat Bone.) Buzz even wrote the track, “Crazy When She Drinks” for the Black Cat Bone album. Buzz and Lee met and a long-standing friendship started. Lee was impressed and produced Hot Rod Lincoln’s critically acclaimed CD titled "Blue Café.” 
Campbell completed his largest tour to date by opening for the Stray Cats European Farwell Tour in the summer of 2008. The band warmed up audiences in seven countries and by the end of the tour, were seen by over 100,000 people.

The Gear 
Campbell is sponsored by Gretsch.
He uses mostly a 2007, 6136 Gretsch White Falcon .
Also has a 1958 Gretsch Country Club(mostly for recording on the RHL and Lee Rocker albums).
On live performances, he has used a 90s red Gretsch Hot Rod.
When writing songs, he also uses a Gibson acoustic.

Albums

Hot Rod Lincoln 
Blue Cafe(1999)
Astraunaut Girl(2001)
Tokyo Bop(2003)
RunAway Girl(2006)
The Best of Buzz Campbell & Hotrodlincoln(2008)

Lee Rocker 
Racin’ the Devil(2006)
Black Cat Bone(2007)

Buzz Campbell Band 
Buzz Campbell: Shivers & Shakes(2010)

References

External links
www.buzzcampbell.com
www.leerocker.com
www.straycats.com
 http://www.hotrodlincoln.net/

American country rock singers
American country singer-songwriters
Living people
Lead guitarists
American male singer-songwriters
American rockabilly guitarists
American male guitarists
1969 births
Musicians from Dallas
Singer-songwriters from Texas
Guitarists from Texas
20th-century American guitarists
Country musicians from Texas
20th-century American male musicians